James Stephen Ewing (December 25, 1866, Pittsburgh – May 16, 1943, New York City) was an American pathologist. He was the first Professor of pathology at Cornell University and discovered a form of bone cancer that was later named after him, Ewing sarcoma.

Life
James Ewing, was born in 1866 to a prominent family of Pittsburgh.  When he was 14 he was diagnosed with osteomyelitis and was bedridden for two years. He first completed his B.A. in 1888 at Amherst College and then studied medicine at the College of Physicians and Surgeons of New York, from 1888 to 1891.  He returned to the College of Physicians and Surgeons as instructor in histology (1893-1897), and clinical pathology (1897-1898). After a brief stint as a surgeon with the US Army, Ewing was appointed in 1899 the first professor of clinical pathology at the newly formed Medical College of Cornell University in New York, where he was the only full-time professor.  In 1902, Ewing helped to establish one of the first funds for cancer research, endowed by Mrs. Collis P. Huntington. With his discoveries using that research funding, Ewing became the most important experimental oncologist and helped to found, in 1907, the American Association for Cancer Research, and in 1913, the American Society for the Control of Cancer, now the American Cancer Society.  In 1906 Ewing, working with S.P. Beebe and collaborators, showed the first proof that a cancer (canine transmissible venereal tumor in dogs) could be transmissible.

In 1910, Ewing had approached New York Hospital about establishing a clinical research facility; when this fell through, he established a collaboration with Memorial Hospital (which would become Memorial Sloan Kettering Cancer Center) with the help of industrialist and philanthropist James Douglas, who gave $100,000 to endow twenty beds for clinical research, equipment for working with radium, and a clinical laboratory to Memorial for that purpose.  Douglas' enthusiasm and funding for development of radiation therapy for cancer inspired Ewing to become one of the pioneers in developing this treatment.  Ewing soon took over effective leadership of clinical and laboratory research at Memorial.

In 1919 Ewing published the first edition of Neoplastic Diseases: A Text-Book on Tumors. The book, which is translated into numerous languages, becomes a cornerstone of modern oncology by establishing a systematic and comprehensive basis for diagnosing human cancer. In 1921 he published a paper detailing a type of osteoma which later received his name: Ewing sarcoma.

In 1931 Ewing was formally appointed president of the hospital and was featured on the cover of Time Magazine as "Cancer Man Ewing"; the accompanying article described his role as one of the most important cancer doctors of his era.  He worked at Memorial Hospital until his retirement in 1939.

Under his leadership, Memorial became a model for other cancer centers in the United States, combining patient care with clinical and laboratory research, and it was said of him that "The relationship of Ewing to the Memorial Hospital can best be expressed in the words of Emerson, 'Every institution is but the lengthening
shadow of some man.' Dr. Ewing is the Memorial Hospital".

In 1951, The James Ewing Hospital, a 12-story building on First Avenue between 67th and 68th Streets, opened; it was intended to treat cancer among New York City's poor.

Bibliography
A collection of his correspondence is held at the National Library of Medicine.

 Zantinga, AR; Coppes, MJ: James Ewing (1866-1943): "the chief". Medical and Pediatric Oncology, New York, 1993, 21 (7): 505-510.
 Huvos, AG: James Ewing: cancer man. Annals of Diagnostic Pathology, April 1998, 2 (2): 146-148.
 Ewing, J: Clinical pathology of Blood: A Treatise on the General Principles and Special Applications of Hematology. Philadelphia and New York, 1901.
 Ewing, J: Neoplastic Diseases: A Textbook on Tumors. Philadelphia, W. B. Saunders, and London, 1919. Fourth edition 1940.
 Ewing, J: Causation, Diagnosis and Treatment of Cancer. Baltimore, 1931.
 Ewing, J: Blood. Philadelphia. 1910.

References 

1866 births
1943 deaths
American pathologists
American oncologists
Cancer researchers
Cornell University faculty
Scientists from Pittsburgh
Deaths from bladder cancer
Amherst College alumni
Deaths from cancer in New York (state)
Columbia University Vagelos College of Physicians and Surgeons alumni